Phalaenopsis schilleriana is a plant of the orchid genus Phalaenopsis and an endemic species to Philippines. It has lilac flowers.

References

External links
 
 

schilleriana
Endemic orchids of the Philippines